Paulo Martelli is a Brazilian classical guitarist. He received musical training in New York where he studied at The Juilliard School and The Manhattan School of Music. He has garnered awards and honors in prestigious national and international competitions and has concertized at halls throughout the United States, Canada and Brazil.  He is noted for being an advocate and practitioner of the eleven-string alto guitar, an unusual non-standard instrument that is well suited to the performance of music originally intended for the lute.

Discography 

CDs
Paulo Martelli plays Diabelli, Paganini, Harris, Castelnouvo Tedesco, Gri Music, 1994
Roots, The Woodhouse Records, USA, 2000
miosótis, Brazil, 2011
A Bach Recital, Guitarcoop, 2017
Geraldo Vespar: 20 Estudos Populares Brasileiros para Violão, Guitarcoop, 2020

DVDs
Movimento Violão, 2009 - 2010
Movimento Violão, 2012
A Bach Recital, 2017

References

 “solid and brilliant technique” Soundboard Magazine, USA 
 “impeccable musicality” Gendai Magazine, Japan

External links
 Facebook page
 Guitarcoop Page
 http://www.albertaugustine.com/artist/paulomartelli.html
 http://andantemoderato.com/carlo-domeniconi-koyunbaba-guitar-paulo-martelli/
 https://www.hcarts.ca/events/guitar-hamilton/
 http://guitarsocietyoftoronto.com/
 http://guitarsocietyoftoronto.com/concert-season/
 http://www.guitarhamilton.com/#!concerts/xi1ry

Brazilian classical guitarists
Brazilian male guitarists
Juilliard School alumni
Manhattan School of Music alumni
1966 births
Living people